Dactylorhiza romana, the Roman dactylorhiza, is a species of orchid. It is native to the Mediterranean Region of southern Europe and northern Africa, the range extending eastward to Iran and Turkmenistan.

Three subspecies are recognized:

Dactylorhiza romana subsp. georgica (Klinge) Soó ex Renz & Taubenheim - Turkey, Caucasus (Armenia, Georgia (country), Azerbaijan, southern Russia), Iran, Turkmenistan
Dactylorhiza romana subsp. guimaraesii (E.G.Camus) H.A.Pedersen - Spain, Portugal, Algeria, Morocco
Dactylorhiza romana subsp. romana - Italy, Greece, the Balkans, Turkey, Crimea, Cyprus, Lebanon, Syria

References

romana
Orchids of Europe
Orchids of Asia
Orchids of Africa
Plants described in 1813